Sakju County is a kun, or county, in northern part of  North P'yŏngan province, in North Korea.  It lies along the Yalu River bordering the People's Republic of China to the north. Within North Korea, it borders Ch'angsŏng to the east, Ch'ŏnma and Taegwan to the south, and Ŭiju to the west.

Geography
The Kangnam Mountains rise in the southeast of Sakju with its highest peak Munsan at 1046 m. The overall terrain is rugged, with only 13% of the county's area under cultivation, as compared to 80% which is forested.

Administrative divisions
Sakju county is divided into 1 ŭp (town), 6 rodongjagu (workers' districts) and 18 ri (villages):

Climate
The year-round average temperature is 8.1 °C, with an average of -10.1 °C in January and 23.4 °C in August.

Economy
Livestock farming is important to the local economy; Sakju leads the province in the number of hogs raised. In crop farming, local crops include rice, soybeans, sweet potatoes, gochu peppers, and fruit. In addition, there is a large hydroelectric power station on the Yalu at Sup'ung Dam.

Transportation
The P'yŏngbuk Line of the Korean State Railway passes through the county, on its way to Chŏngju from Ch'ŏngsu (청수).  The Yalu station is used for passenger and freight traffic.

Education
There are eight colleges in Sakju. These include Supung Industrial College, Sakju Industrial College, and Supung Specialized College of Electricity (수풍전기단과대학).

Military
Some of North Korea's chemical weapons factories are located in the city under the control of the Thirty-second Division.

See also
Geography of North Korea
Administrative divisions of North Korea
North Pyongan

References

External links

Counties of North Pyongan